Anthony George Cullis FRS (16 January 1946 – 9 December 2021) was a British electronic engineer, and professor at University of Sheffield.

Life
Cullis was born on 16 January 1946 in Worcester. He earned a BA at the University of Oxford in 1968, and MA, and DPhil in Semiconducting Materials at Oxford University in 1972.

He died on 9 December 2021, at the age of 75.

References

External links
http://www.sheffield.ac.uk/eee/staff/t_cullis

1946 births
2021 deaths
Alumni of Wadham College, Oxford
British electrical engineers
Fellows of the Royal Society